Guanosine monophosphate synthetase, also known as GMPS is an enzyme that converts xanthosine monophosphate to guanosine monophosphate.

In the de novo synthesis of purine nucleotides, IMP is the branch point metabolite at which point the pathway diverges to the synthesis of either guanine or adenine nucleotides. In the guanine nucleotide pathway, there are 2 enzymes involved in converting IMP to GMP, namely IMP dehydrogenase (IMPD1), which catalyzes the oxidation of IMP to XMP, and GMP synthetase, which catalyzes the amination of XMP to GMP.

Enzymology

In enzymology, a GMP synthetase (glutamine-hydrolysing) is an enzyme that catalyzes the chemical reaction

ATP + xanthosine 5'-phosphate + L-glutamine + H2O  AMP + diphosphate + GMP + L-glutamate

The 4 substrates of this enzyme are ATP, xanthosine 5'-phosphate, L-glutamine, and H2O, whereas its 4 products are AMP, diphosphate, GMP, and L-glutamate.

This enzyme belongs to the family of ligases, specifically those forming carbon-nitrogen bonds carbon-nitrogen ligases with glutamine as amido-N-donor.  The systematic name of this enzyme class is xanthosine-5'-phosphate:L-glutamine amido-ligase (AMP-forming).   This enzyme participates in purine metabolism and glutamate metabolism.  At least one compound, Psicofuranin is known to inhibit this enzyme.

Structural studies

Role in metabolism

Purine metabolism 
GMP synthase is the second step in the generation of GMP from IMP; the first step occurs when IMP dehydrogenase generates XMP, and then GMP synthetase is able to react with glutamine and ATP to generate GMP. IMP may also be generated into AMP by adenylosuccinate synthetase and then adenylosuccinate lyase.

Amino acid metabolism 
GMP synthase is also involved in amino acid metabolism because it generates L-glutamate from L-glutamine.

Organismal involvement 
This enzyme is widely distributed and a number of crystal structures have been solved, including in Escherichia coli, Pyrococcus Horikoshii, Thermoplasma acidophil, Homo sapiens, Thermus thermophilus and Mycobacterium tuberculosis. The most extensive structural studies have been done in E. coli.

Structure and function 
GMP synthase forms a tetramer in an open box shape, which is a dimer of dimers. The R interfaces are held together with a hydrophobic core and a beta sheet, while the P dimer interfaces do not have a hydrophobic core and are more variable than the R interfaces. This enzyme also binds several ligands, including phosphate, pyrophosphate, AMP, citrate and Magnesium.

Class I Amidotransferase Domain 
The amidotransferase domain is responsible for removal of the amide nitrogen from the glutamine substrate. The class I amidotransferase domain is made of the N terminal 206 residues of the enzyme, and consists of 12 beta strands and 5 alpha helices; the core of this domain is an open 7-stranded mixed beta sheet. Its catalytic triad includes Cys86, His181 and Glu183. His181 is a base and Glu183 is a Hydrogen bond acceptor from the Histidine imidazole ring. Cys86 is the catalytic residue and is conserved. It falls into a nucleophile elbow, where it is at the end of a beta strand and the beginning of an alpha helix, and has little flexibility in its phi and psi angles; thus, Gly84 and Gly88 are conserved and allow for the tight packing of amino acids surrounding the catalytic residue.

Synthetase Domain: ATP Pyrophosphatase domain 
The synthetase domain is responsible for the addition of the abstracted Nitrogen to the acceptor substrate. The ATP Pyrophosphatase domain consists of a beta sheet containing 5 parallel strands with several alpha helices on each side. The P loop is the nucleotide binding motif; residues 235-241 make up the P loop which specifically binds to pyrophosphate.

The structure of this domain is what creates the specificity of this enzyme for ATP. The binding pocket forms hydrophobic interactions with the adenine ring, and the backbone of Val260 forms H bonds with multiple Nitrogens in the ring of AMP, which excludes substituents on the C2 purine ring. This creates extreme specificity for adenine and ATP binding.

References

Further reading

External links 
 
 PDBe-KB provides an overview of all the structure information available in the PDB for Human GMP synthase [glutamine-hydrolyzing]

EC 6.3.5
Enzymes of known structure